The lapa is a wind instrument originating in 19th century China.  It is made of metal and shaped like an oboe.  The lapa is usually 94 centimeters in length.

See also 
 Chinese music

References 

Woodwind instruments